Our Boots (foaled 1938) was an American Champion Thoroughbred racehorse. He won a Daily Racing Form poll to be voted the 1940 American Champion Two-Year-Old Colt. The rival Turf & Sports Digest poll was topped by Whirlaway. He was sired by Bull Dog, the 1943 Leading sire in North America, and was out of the English-born mare Maid of Arches.

Our Boots was owned and raced by the Woodvale Farm of Royce G. Martin, who bought him at the Saratoga Sales for $3,500. He was trained by Steve Judge. The colt's most important wins of his two-year-old championship season came in the Futurity Trial  and the Futurity Stakes at Belmont Park, in which he defeated future U.S. Triple Crown winner and Hall of Fame inductee Whirlaway.

A winterbook favorite for the Kentucky Derby, Our Boots won the Blue Grass Stakes, then finished eighth in the Derby and third in the Preakness Stakes.

As a sire,  Our Boots produced some offspring that met with modest racing success.

References

1938 racehorse births
Thoroughbred family 14-e
Racehorses bred in the United States
Racehorses trained in the United States
American Champion racehorses